The 1975 National Invitation Tournament was the 38th edition of the oldest annual NCAA college basketball postseason tournament.

Selected teams
Below is a list of the 16 teams selected for the tournament.

 Clemson
 Connecticut
 Holy Cross
 Lafayette
 Manhattan
 Massachusetts
 Memphis
 Oral Roberts
 Oregon
 Pittsburgh
 Princeton
 Providence
 Saint Peter's
 St. John's
 South Carolina
 Southern Illinois

Bracket
Below is the tournament bracket.

See also
 1975 NCAA Division I basketball tournament
 1975 NCAA Division II basketball tournament
 1975 NCAA Division III basketball tournament
 1975 NAIA Division I men's basketball tournament
 1975 National Women's Invitational Tournament

References

National Invitation
National Invitation Tournament
1970s in Manhattan
Basketball in New York City
College sports in New York City
Madison Square Garden
National Invitation Tournament
National Invitation Tournament
Sports competitions in New York City
Sports in Manhattan